Arnold Short Bull (Lakota: Tȟatȟáŋka Ptéčela; c. 1845 – 1915), a member of the Sičháŋǧu (Brulé) Lakota tribe of Native Americans, instrumental in bringing the Ghost Dance movement to the Rosebud Reservation.

Ghost Dance, 1890-91
He was active in the Ghost Dance religious movement of 1890, and had traveled with fellow Lakota Kicking Bear to Nevada to visit the movement's leader, Wovoka. The two were instrumental in bringing the movement to the Lakota living on reservations in South Dakota, and Short Bull became the ranking apostle of the movement to the Brulé at Rosebud Reservation. He preached a militant and apocalyptic vision of the Ghost Dance, in which the spirits of Native American ancestors would return to restore the old way of life, while the whites would be erased from the land, believing that performing the ghost dance would hasten the arrival of this promise land. He also advocated against the new farms promoted on the reservation, and encouraged his followers to sell all farming supplies for weapons and ammunition. Incidents of Native Americans slaughtering livestock also scared the authorities as well as settlers in the area.

While delivering a sermon to a large crowd of Brulé, Short Bull said that they must perform the dance at Pass Creek in November during the full moon, in order to bring about the promised land earlier than expected. Stressing the importance of this dance, Short Bull instructed them to stop for no reason, and that supernatural forces would protect them even if soldiers tried to stop the ritual, saying: "There may be soldiers surround you, but pay no attention to them, continue the dance. If the soldiers surround you four deep, three of you on whom I have put holy shirts will sing a song, which I have taught you, around them, when some of them will drop dead, then the rest will start to run, but their horses will sink into the earth; the riders will jump from their horses, but they will sink into the earth also; then you can do as you desire with them. Now you must know this, that all the soldiers and that race will be dead; there will be only five thousand [Indians?] left living on earth. My friends and relations, this is straight and true." 

Following the fatal shooting of Sitting Bull, Short Bull was imprisoned at Fort Sheridan, Illinois.

Later life
On his release in 1891, Short Bull joined Buffalo Bill Cody's Wild West Show, and made several trips to Europe with the show. Short Bull died in 1915, on the Rosebud Reservation in South Dakota.

Portraits of Short Bull
 Denver Public Library or by George Spencer, Minnesota Historical Society.
 By George Heyn, Minnesota Historical Society.

Sources 

1840s births
1923 deaths
Ghost Dance movement
Religious figures of the indigenous peoples of North America
People from Rosebud Indian Reservation, South Dakota
Brulé people
Date of birth unknown